The Texas Tech Red Raiders softball team competes in the NCAA Division I, representing Texas Tech University as a member of the Big 12 Conference. Texas Tech has played its home games at Rocky Johnson Field in Lubbock, Texas since 2001.

History

Coaching history

Coaching staff

See also
List of NCAA Division I softball programs

References

External links